The 1918–19 season was the 46th season of competitive football in Scotland and the 29th season of the Scottish Football League.

Scottish Football League

Champions: Celtic

Scottish Cup

There was no Scottish Cup competition played.

Other honours

National

County

Junior Cup

Rutherglen Glencairn won the Junior Cup after a 1–0 win over St Anthony's in a replayed final.

Scotland national team

There were no Scotland matches played with the British Home Championship suspended due to World War I. Scotland did play four unofficial wartime internationals (known as the Victory Internationals), however, playing home and away against both Ireland and England.

22 March 1919, Scotland 2–1 Ireland. Scotland were represented by Jimmy Brownlie, Alec McNair, Bobby Orr, Jimmy Gordon, William Cringan, Jimmy McMullan, Alex Donaldson, James Bowie, Andrew Wilson, George Miller and Alan Morton.
19 April 1919, Ireland 0–0 Scotland. Scotland were represented by Jimmy Brownlie, Jack Marshall, Jimmy Blair, Jimmy Gordon, William McNamee, Jimmy McMullan, Alex Donaldson, Johnny Crosbie, James Richardson, Tommy Cairns and Malcolm McPhail.
26 April 1919, England 2–2 Scotland. Scotland were represented by Jimmy Brownlie, Alec McNair, Jimmy Blair, Jimmy Gordon, John Wright, Jimmy McMullan, Alex Donaldson, James Bowie, James Richardson, Jimmy McMenemy and Alan Morton.
3 May 1919, Scotland 3–4 England. Scotland were represented by Jimmy Brownlie, Alec McNair, Jimmy Blair, Jimmy Gordon, John Wright, Jimmy McMullan, James Reid, James Bowie, Andrew Wilson, Jimmy McMenemy and Alan Morton.

See also
 1918–19 Rangers F.C. season
 Association football during World War I

Notes and references

External links
Scottish Football Historical Archive

 
Seasons in Scottish football
Wartime seasons in Scottish football